In Greek mythology, the name Aretaon (Ancient Greek: Ἀρετάων Aretāōn) refers to the following figures associated with the Trojan War, who may or may not be one and the same character:

Aretaon, father of the Phrygian leaders Ascanius and (possibly) Phorcys.
Aretaon, a defender of Troy who was killed by Teucer.

Notes

References 

 Apollodorus, The Library with an English Translation by Sir James George Frazer, F.B.A., F.R.S. in 2 Volumes, Cambridge, MA, Harvard University Press; London, William Heinemann Ltd. 1921. ISBN 0-674-99135-4. Online version at the Perseus Digital Library. Greek text available from the same website.
Homer, The Iliad with an English Translation by A.T. Murray, Ph.D. in two volumes. Cambridge, MA., Harvard University Press; London, William Heinemann, Ltd. 1924. . Online version at the Perseus Digital Library.
Homer, Homeri Opera in five volumes. Oxford, Oxford University Press. 1920. . Greek text available at the Perseus Digital Library.

Trojans
People of the Trojan War